Spondylosoma (meaning "vertebra body") is a genus of avemetatarsalian archosaur belonging to the clade Aphanosauria from the late Ladinian-age Middle Triassic Lower Santa Maria Formation in Paleorrota Geopark, Brazil.

History
Friedrich von Huene based the genus on a fragmentary postcranial skeleton held at the University of Tübingen. This skeleton includes two teeth, two cervical vertebrae, four dorsal vertebrae, three sacral vertebrae, scapulae, part of a humerus, part of a femur, and part of a pubis. At the time, he thought it was a prosauropod.

With the discovery of the basal dinosaur Staurikosaurus, Spondylosoma drew attention as a possible relative. Authors went back and forth on the question, considering it either as a basal dinosaur, or as a "thecodont" or other basal archosaur. In 2000, Peter Galton noted that it lacks dinosaurian characteristics and was probably a rauisuchian more closely related to rauisuchids, whereas in 2004 Max Langer disputed this and included Spondylosoma as a possible basal dinosaur similar to the herrerasaurs (but did not firmly rule out rauisuchian affinities). In his 2009 thesis on archosaur evolution, Sterling Nesbitt placed Spondylosoma at Archosauria incertae sedis, noting that the characters used by Galton to tentatively place the genus in Rauisuchidae are also found in Aetosauria, and that the holotype lacks characters to place it in either Pseudosuchia or Ornithodira.

The redescription of Teleocrater revealed numerous similarities between Spondylosoma and a few other Triassic taxa leading to their referral to a new clade of archosaurs, Aphanosauria, which is the sister to Ornithodira within Avemetatarsalia.

References

Middle Triassic archosaurs
Middle Triassic reptiles of South America
Ladinian genera
Triassic Brazil
Fossils of Brazil
Santa Maria Formation
Paleontology in Rio Grande do Sul
Fossil taxa described in 1942
Prehistoric avemetatarsalians